Dariya Sharipova (born 4 June 1990) is a Ukrainian sports shooter. She competed at the 2008 and 2012 Summer Olympics. Sharipova won silver medal at 2017 European Championships in 50m rifle prone event.

References

External links
 

1990 births
Living people
Ukrainian female sport shooters
Olympic shooters of Ukraine
Shooters at the 2008 Summer Olympics
Shooters at the 2012 Summer Olympics
Sportspeople from Cherkasy
Universiade medalists in shooting
Universiade bronze medalists for Ukraine
Medalists at the 2013 Summer Universiade
21st-century Ukrainian women